Flygsfors is a locality situated in Nybro Municipality, Kalmar County, Sweden with 226 inhabitants in 2010.

References

External links 

Populated places in Kalmar County
Populated places in Nybro Municipality